David Sinclair Whitaker (6 January 1931 – 11 January 2012) was an English composer, songwriter, arranger, and conductor who was most active in the 1960s and 1970s.

Musical works

Whitaker, who was born in Kingston upon Thames, collaborated with many prestigious British and French artists including Air, Etienne Daho, Marianne Faithfull, Claude François, Serge Gainsbourg, France Gall, Johnny Hallyday, The Rolling Stones, Jimmy Page (for the soundtrack to Death Wish II), Saint Etienne, Simply Red and Sylvie Vartan, and other international artists including Lee Hazlewood, Kings of Convenience and Francesco De Gregori.

Whitaker recorded several sessions with the BBC Radio Orchestra at the Maida Vale Studios, London, in the early 1980s, featuring a mixture of his own compositions and arrangements, to high acclaim.

In 1992, David Whitaker (along with Adrian Burch), arranged and produced a recording of the Buddy Holly hit "Heartbeat" with vocals performed by actor/singer Nick Berry. It was to be used as the title theme for popular ITV drama series Heartbeat, which also starred Berry. The single was released in 1992 and reached number 2 on the U.K. chart. It was used on every episode of the series until its cancellation in 2010. David and Adrian also composed incidental music for many episodes, although with an increase in the number of episodes produced per year and the reduction in production time per episode, episodes later began to be heavily scored with sections of 1960s pop songs.

Alongside his other collaborations, David Whitaker recorded many interpretations of songs for albums released by Reader's Digest. They were usually credited to David Whitaker And His Orchestra.

Work with Shel Talmy

Shel Talmy was a major record producer with whom Whitaker collaborated. Talmy used Whitaker as arranger and orchestra leader extensively on his sessions from 1965 through to the 1970s, which included singles released on Talmy's Planet label.

Talmy produced Music To Spy By, the 1966 David Whitaker Orchestra album for CBS, composed of Whitaker originals.

He also produced the albums And A Touch Of Love by Bill Davies, and The Revolutionary Piano of Nicky Hopkins, for which Whitaker did the arrangements.

Whitaker was also the arranger on the Talmy-produced fortieth birthday by Lee Hazlewood, Forty.

Talmy was also involved with several of the film soundtracks that Whitaker composed, and was the musical director on the film, Scream And Scream Again, starring Vincent Price and Christopher Lee.

Selected film scores
 1968: Hammerhead, directed by David Miller, starring Vince Edwards
 1968: Don't Raise the Bridge, Lower the River, directed by Jerry Paris, starring Jerry Lewis
 1969: The Desperados, directed by Henry Levin, starring Jack Palance
 1969: Run Wild, Run Free, directed by Richard C. Sarafian, starring John Mills
 1970: Scream and Scream Again, directed by Gordon Hessler, starring Vincent Price, Christopher Lee
 1970: Eyewitness, directed by John Hough, starring Mark Lester, Susan George
 1971: Dr. Jekyll and Sister Hyde, directed by Roy Ward Baker, starring Ralph Bates, Martine Beswick
 1972: Vampire Circus, directed by Robert Young, starring Adrienne Corri
 1972: That's Your Funeral, directed by John Robins, starring Bill Fraser
 1972: Danny Jones, directed by Jules Bricken, starring Frank Finlay
 1974: Vampira, directed by Clive Donner, starring David Niven, Teresa Graves
 1974: Mistress Pamela, directed by Jim O'Connolly, starring Ann Michelle
 1978: The Playbirds, directed by Willy Roe, starring Mary Millington
 1978: Dominique, directed by Michael Anderson, starring Cliff Robertson, Jean Simmons
 1979: Confessions from the David Galaxy Affair, directed by Willy Roe, starring Alan Lake, Mary Millington
 1982: The Sword and the Sorcerer, directed by Albert Pyun, starring Lee Horsley, Kathleen Beller
 1998: Shadow Run, directed by Geoffrey Reeve, starring Michael Caine, James Fox
 2000: With a Friend Like Harry (Harry, un ami qui vous veut du bien), directed by Dominik Moll, starring Sergi López
 2006: Lemming, directed by Dominik Moll, starring Charlotte Rampling, Charlotte Gainsbourg

Discography

Compilation 
 2002: The David Whitaker Songbook, 1 CD Collection "Musée de l’Imaginaire", Album 20 Tricatel - Compiled by Thomas Jamois and Bertrand Burgalat with the help of David Whitaker (all selections arranged and conducted by David Sinclair Whitaker), track listing:
 The Andrew Oldham OrchestraThe Last Time(Mick Jagger, Keith Richards) Westminster Music / ABKCO Music, Inc. (BMI)(P) 1967 Immediate Records, lnc
 Long ChrisLa Petite fille de l’hiver(Éric Demarsan, Long Chris) Ed. Tulsa(P) 1967 Philips
 OST Run Wild, Run FreePhilip’s Triumph(David Whitaker) Screen Gems-Columbia, BMI(P) 1969 SGC
 Music To Spy ByStrange Affair(David Whitaker)(P) 1965 CBS
 NicoI‘m Not Saying(Gordon Lightfoot) Chelsea Music Publishing(P) 1965 Andrew Loog Oldham Production
 Music to spy byAlive at Last(David Whitaker)(P) 1965 CBS
 OST Run Wild, Run FreeA Ride on the White Colt(David Whitaker) Screen Gems-Columbia, BMI(P) 1969 SGC
 Lee HazlewoodWhat’s More I Don’t Need Her(Lee Hazlewood) Lee Hazlewood Music, Corp(P) 1970 Lee Hazlewood Music, Corp
 David WhitakerPavane(David Whitaker)(P) 1974 Reserved rights
 David WhitakerSusie(David Whitaker)(P) 1974 Reserved rights
 OST Run Wild, Run FreePhilip on the Moors(David Whitaker) Screen Gems-Columbia, BMI(P) 1969 SGC
 OST Run Wild, Run FreePhilip Grows Up(David Whitaker) Screen Gems-Columbia, BMI(P) 1969 SGC
 OST HammerheadHood Explore The Triton(David Whitaker) Screen Gems-Columbia, BMI(P) 1968 Colgems Records, lnc
 Music To Spy ByInterception(David Whitaker)(P) 1965 SGC
 France GallChanson Indienne (Indian Song)(lyrics: Robert Gall; music: David Whitaker) Ed. Sidonie(P) 1968 Philips
 OST Harry un ami qui vous veut du bienL’Autoroute des vacances(David Whitaker) Ed. Diaphana / BMG Music Pub.(P) 2000 Diaphana / Source
 Marianne FaithfullPlaisir d'Amour(Public domain)(P) 1965 Andrew Loog Oldham Production
 Music To Spy ByCressida(David Whitaker)(P) 1965 SGC
 Music To Spy ByMr Mouthpiece(David Whitaker)(P) 1965 SGC
 AirRemember (David Whitaker version)(Nicolas Godin, Jean-Benoît Dunckel) Ed. Revolvair(P) 1998 Source
 David WhitakerDominique(David Whitaker)(P) 1973 Reserved rights

Awards 
 David Whitaker, nominated in 2001 for the César Award for Best Music Written for a Film with the French movie With a Friend Like Harry (Harry, un ami qui vous veut du bien) directed by Dominik Moll.

Death 
Whitaker died on 11 January 2012.

References

External links 
 

English conductors (music)
British male conductors (music)
English composers
English songwriters
1931 births
2012 deaths
People from Kingston upon Thames
Varèse Sarabande Records artists
British male songwriters